Jacklyn may refer to:

People
 Jacklyn Frank, Antiguan and Barbudan politician first elected in 2017
 Jacklyn H. Lucas (1928–2008), American World War II Marine awarded the Medal of Honor
 Jacky Rosen (born 1957), American politician
 Jackie Trad (born 1972), Australian former politician
 Jacklyn Wu (born 1968), Taiwanese actress and singer
 Jacklyn Zeman (born 1953), American actress
 Robert Jacklyn (1922–2014), Australian physicist

Other uses
 Jacklyn (ship), a landing platform ship
 Mount Jacklyn, part of the Athos Range, Mac. Robertson Land, Antarctica

See also
 Jaclyn, a feminine given name
 Jacqueline (disambiguation)